Jan Maria Fleischmann (July 6, 1885 – September 23, 1939) was a Czechoslovak ice hockey player who competed in the 1924 Winter Olympics.

In 1924 he participated with the Czechoslovak team in the first Winter Olympics ice hockey tournament. His younger brother Miroslav was also a member of the squad.

External links
Olympic ice hockey tournaments 1924  

1885 births
1939 deaths
Czech ice hockey defencemen
Czechoslovak ice hockey defencemen
HC Slavia Praha players
Ice hockey people from Prague
Ice hockey players at the 1924 Winter Olympics
Olympic ice hockey players of Czechoslovakia
People from the Kingdom of Bohemia